Taravana is a disease often found among Polynesian island natives who habitually dive deep without breathing apparatus many times in close succession, usually for food or pearls. These free-divers may make 40 to 60 dives a day, each of 30 or 40 metres (100 to 140 feet).

Taravana seems to be decompression sickness. The usual symptoms are vertigo, nausea, lethargy, paralysis and death. The word taravana is Tuamotu Polynesian for "to fall crazily".  

Taravana is also used to describe someone who is "crazy because of the sea".

References 

Decompression sickness